Roxburgh (Gaelic, Rosbrog) is a village off the A699, by the River Teviot, near Kelso in the Scottish Borders area of Scotland.

It should not be confused with the historic royal burgh of Roxburgh, the site of which lies about 2 miles (3.2 km) northeast of the present village.

Other places nearby include Ednam, Heiton, Maxton, Morebattle, Smailholm, Sprouston and Stichill.

The Borders Abbeys Way passes through the village.

See also
List of places in the Scottish Borders
List of places in Scotland

External links
RCAHMS record of Roxburgh Parish Church, Churchyard
Geograph image of Roxburgh from the Viaduct, with the River Teviot

Villages in the Scottish Borders